The 2010 Chicago White Sox season was the organization's 111th season in Chicago and 110th in the American League. The Sox opened the season against the Cleveland Indians at home on April 5 and closed the season also against the Indians at home on October 3. They finished the season with an 88–74 record, in second place in the American League Central, six games behind the division champions Minnesota Twins.

The interleague games that the Sox played were Chicago Cubs both at home and on the road since Sox and Cubs are crosstown rivals, Atlanta Braves and Florida Marlins at home, and Washington Nationals and Pittsburgh Pirates on the road. It was the fifth year in a row that the Sox competed against Pittsburgh as an interleague team besides the Cubs. Also it was the first time that Sox played the Washington Nationals since that franchise moved from Montreal following the 2004 season.

Offseason 
 October 5, 2009 – SP Freddy García 2010 $1 million option picked up.
 October 6, 2009 – RP Matt Thornton 2010 $2.25 million option picked up.
 October 9, 2009 – OF DeWayne Wise granted free agency after rejecting a Triple A assignment.
 November 5, 2009 – OF/1B Mark Kotsay is resigned 1 year/$1.5 million.
 November 5, 2009 – Acquire 3B Mark Teahen from Kansas City, via trade for 2B Chris Getz and 3B Josh Fields.
 November 6, 2009 – OF Jermaine Dye $12 million mutual option is declined, declaring him a free agent.
 November 23, 2009 – INF Omar Vizquel agrees to 1 year/$1.375 million deal.
 November 25, 2009 – OF/DH Andruw Jones agrees to 1 year/$500K deal, with the ability to earn $1 million in performance bonus.
 December 11, 2009 – RP J. J. Putz agrees to 1 year/$3 million deal with $3 million incentive bonuses.
 December 12, 2009 – RP D. J. Carrasco is non-tendered declaring him a Free Agent.
 December 18, 2009 – Acquired OF Juan Pierre from Los Angeles Dodgers for minor league pitchers Jon Link and John Ely.

Spring training

March 
(9–16–5)

April 
(3–0)

Regular season

Season standings

Record vs. opponents

Detailed records

Season summary

General 
 Games played: 162
 Record: 88–74
 Winning percentage: .543
 Rank: 2nd
 Games behind: 6.0
 Biggest lead: 3.5 games (last on July 20)
 Farthest behind: 12.0 games (last on September 22)
 Most games over .500: 17 (last on September 6)
 Most games under .500: 9 (last on June 8)
 Longest winning streak: 11 (June 15 to 26)
 Longest losing streak: 8 (September 14 to 21)
 Series record: 25–24–3
 Series sweep: 10–4
 Longest game: 12 innings (May 7 vs. Blue Jays)
 Shortest game: 6 innings (October 2 vs. Indians)

Records 
 Home: 45–36
 Road: 43–38
 Day: 31–18
 Night: 57–56
 Open: 86–72
 Dome: 2–2
 Grass: 84–70
 Turf: 4–4
 vs. RHP: 68–54
 vs. LHP: 20–20
 vs. East division teams: 17–18
 vs. Central division teams: 32–40
 vs. West division teams: 24–13
 vs. American League teams: 73–71
 vs. National League teams: 15–3
 vs. winning teams (>.500): 26–32
 vs. tying teams (.500): 12–15
 vs. losing teams (<.500): 50–27
 April: 9–14
 May: 13–14
 June: 18–9
 July: 18–8
 August: 14–15
 September: 14–13
 October: 2–1
 First half: 49–38
 Second half: 39–36
 Sunday: 12–14
 Monday: 9–4
 Tuesday: 13–12
 Wednesday: 13–12
 Thursday: 12–9
 Friday: 14–10
 Saturday: 15–13

Scoring 
 Runs scored: 752
 Runs allowed: 704
 Pythagorean record: 86–76
 Runs scored per game: 4.64
 Runs allowed per game: 4.35
 Blowout games: 23–20
 One-run games: 28–21
 9-inning games: 81–64
 Extra-inning games: 6–10
 Shortened games: 1–0
 Walk-off wins: 3
 Walk-off losses: 7
 Comeback victories: 44
 Blown leads: 34
 Shutouts: 11
 Shutouts by opponent: 5
 10+ runs scored: 9
 10+ runs allowed: 9
 Most runs scored: 15 (June 9 vs. Tigers and July 11 vs. Royals)
 Most runs allowed: 13 (May 23 vs. Marlins and August 15 vs. Tigers)

Composite inning summary

Opening Day lineup

Summaries by month

April 

On the Opening Day, the White Sox shutout the Cleveland 6–0. On that day, Mark Buehrle made an astounding play when he hurried and picked up a ball with his glove in foul territory and quickly underthrew backwards with his glove to Paul Konerko, who caught the ball with his bare hand to force out Lou Marson in the fifth inning for the second out. On April 12 at Blue Jays, the Sox snapped their ten-game losing streak in Rogers Centre and took the first victory since June 1, 2007, beating the Blue Jays 8–7 in 11 innings. In the next two games, Carlos Quentin hit the White Sox's first grand slam of the season, beating the Jays 11–1. The Sox split the four-game series with Blue Jays. On April 16–18, the Sox got swept by the Indians in Cleveland for the first time since May 30 to June 2, 2003. On April 23 against the Mariners, Andruw Jones hit two home runs on his 33rd birthday including his walk-off home run which made it 7–6. On the next day, in the top of the ninth inning, Casey Kotchman hit a soft ground ball down the right field line and a fan reached over and pick up the ball with his bare hand in foul territory. This is a fan interference ground rule double which two men scored from first and second making it 4–2 Mariner lead. Then in the bottom frame, the Sox scored three runs via two home runs, one by Paul Konerko (solo shot) and a walk-off by Alex Ríos (two-run homer), which made it 5–4. On the next day, White Sox swept the Mariners at a score of 3–2 with Paul Konerko's GW home run in the eighth inning. Paul Konerko broke the franchise record for most home runs hit during the month of April with 11. However the Sox finished the month with a not-so good record of 9–14.

May 
On May 7 against the Toronto Blue Jays at home, J. J. Putz allowed a three-run home run to Álex González in the twelfth inning which made it 7–4 for the White Sox loss. Two days later against the same team, Bobby Jenks blew his save for allowing Fred Lewis a three-run home run which made it 8–7 Toronto lead. Sox lost three-out-of-four at home against the Toronto Blue Jays while the Sox split the series in Toronto last month. On May 11, the Sox opened the two-game series at the new Target Field and took the victory 5–2 over Minnesota, but the next day lost 3–2. On May 21 against the Florida Marlins in first interleague play, the Sox took the victory 8–0 as Alexei Ramírez had 5 RBIs with two-run double and three-run homer. Two days later, the Sox suffered a big shut-out loss 13–0 to the Marlins on Sunday. The Sox finished the month with a record of 13–14.

June 
On June 13 against the Cubs at Wrigley Field, Gavin Floyd pitched a no-hitter through 6.2 innings before allowing a double to Alfonso Soriano and then the next batter scored Soriano by Chad Tracy's RBI single. The opposing pitcher Ted Lilly didn't allow a hit through 8+ innings before allowing a single to Juan Pierre. Later that inning, the bases were loaded, so it would have golden opportunities for Sox to score some runs, but failed. The Sox failed to sweep the Cubs as they lose 1–0 with one hit for Sox and three hits for Cubs. From June 12–20, they went eight straight games without hitting home runs, their longest since 1989, which they went nine straight homerless games. However, during their homerless streak, the Sox went 7–1, thanks to their starting pitching. During their span, the Sox have won six straight without hitting home runs for the first time since 1942. Then on June 22 against the Atlanta Braves, Carlos Quentin blasted a 3-run homer in the fourth inning, snapping their 8-game homerless streak in a 9–6 seventh straight win. For the Braves, they snapped their 42-game winning streak when scoring five or more runs, dating back to last season. From June 15–24, the Sox went three-consecutive three-game sweeps for the first time in franchise history. They swept the Pittsburgh Pirates and Washington Nationals on the road, and Atlanta Braves at home. They have won eleven in a row for the first time since June 1961, which they have won twelve in a row. The Sox finished the month with an awesome 18–9 record.

July 
On July 5–8, the Sox got their four-game sweep over the Los Angeles Angels for the first time since 2005 when they swept the Astros in the World Series. On July 11 against the Kansas City Royals, Andruw Jones hit his 400th career home run in third inning, 46th player in major league history to accomplish this feat. Also the Sox hit five home runs in the game, including four in third inning, tying their franchise history, including two back-to-backs. The Sox swept the Royals with a 15−5 victory and finished with a perfect homestand 7–0. From June 8 until the All-Star break, the Sox were 25–5, their best in MLB. On June 8, the Sox were 24–33 and 9½ games out of the first place. Just 40 days later, the Sox were 50–41 and were in first place by 1½ games over the Detroit Tigers. On July 18 against the Minnesota Twins at Target Field, the Sox led 6–3 going into the bottom of the ninth inning. Then the Twins scored four runs without getting anybody out and suffering Sox their first walk-off loss of the season. Just three days later, the Sox suffered another walk-off loss, this time in extra innings at Seattle Mariners. The Sox scored one run in the top 11 and then Mariners came back with two in the bottom 11. One day after that defeat by Mariners, manager Ozzie Guillén was considering J. J. Putz to replace Bobby Jenks as a closer after blowing his save twice over his last three appearances. On July 23, Mark Buehrle celebrated one-year anniversary of his perfect game by taking a complete game victory over the Oakland Athletics in Oakland. He allowed 1 earned run, 4 hits, 0 walk and 2 strikeouts. From July 26–29, the Sox swept the four-game series over the Seattle Mariners for the first time since 1994 and finished the season series versus the Mariners 9–1 and outscoring them 58–26. The Sox finished the month with an overall record of 18–8 and incredible 12–1 at home.

August 
On August 3, the White Sox played a split doubleheader at Detroit Tigers, which the Sox won 12–2 in afternoon game and lost 7–1 in night game. The afternoon game was a made-up game from May 17. The next day, Edwin Jackson made his White Sox debut against his former teammate, in which he had 7.0 IP, 9 H, ER, BB, 6 K. Jackson took his first win with the White Sox since moving from Arizona against Armando Galarraga, whose perfect game was lost by the blown call by an umpire on June 2. Jackson threw a no-hitter against the Tampa Bay Rays in St. Petersburg on June 25. Also on the same day, Chris Sale, who was the White Sox's 13th overall pick in the 2010 Major League Baseball draft, was added to the roster as a relief pitcher. Sale was the first 2010 draft pick to be added to an MLB roster. After that game, the Sox were 37–13 (.740) over their last 50 games since June 8, the best record in MLB during that span. On the next day, in the top of the ninth inning, Paul Konerko singled and Mark Kotsay hit a two-run home run which made it a 4–1 Sox lead. But in the bottom of that frame, Ryan Raburn hit a game-tying three-run homer off of Bobby Jenks which tied the game at 4–4. Then in the top of the 11th, Mark Kotsay hit a two-run triple on which Brent Lillibridge and Andruw Jones scored which made it 6–4 Sox lead. In the bottom of the 11th with two outs, Ryan Raburn, who hit a game-tying three-run homer in the ninth, grounded out with men on first and second to end game for a White Sox victory. Sergio Santos got his first major league victory after he pitched two innings following Jenks, who blew his third save of the season. In that series, the White Sox took three out of four from the Tigers in Comerica Park, even though Tigers had one of the best home records in the American League. On August 9 against the Baltimore Orioles at Camden Yards, it is the first time this season that the White Sox pitcher (J. J. Putz) allow a walk-off home run (to Brian Roberts) and lost 3-out-of-4 in a series with two walk-off extra-inning losses under the Orioles' new manager Buck Showalter. The Sox got four walk-off losses since the All-Star break and were then 2–4 in walk-off games that season. For the Orioles, they led the American League in walk-off wins at 9, including three under Showalter. From August 10 to 12, the Sox lost the series against the Twins and fell to second place in the AL Central, one game back. Also the Sox lost the series at home for the first time since June 4–6 against the Indians, snapping their seven straight home series wins. During the time between series losses at home, the Sox were 20–3 while the Sox swept four opponents. From August 17–19, the Sox played a series against the rival Twins at Target Field when the Sox were three games behind the first-place Twins prior to the first game. In the first game, the former White Sox teammate Jim Thome hit a walk-off two-run homer off of Matt Thornton in the tenth inning to down the White Sox 7–6. In the second game, the Twins beat the Sox again 7–6 with the final batter out. And then in the third game, the Sox blew out the Twins 11–0 to avoid a sweep. The Sox snapped the Twins 9-game home winning streak and they snapped their five-game losing streak at Target Field. On August 29, The White Sox hosted Frank Thomas day at U.S. Cellular Field against the New York Yankees. Thomas' jersey was retired that day, along with his face put up on the legendary wall in right-center field next to Billy Pierce on his left and Carlton Fisk on his right, and also right under 'The Catch' logo. On August 30 against the Indians in Cleveland, in the bottom of the ninth inning, the Sox blew a three-run lead to tie the game at 6 thanks to his fourth blown save by Jenks. Then in the top of the eleventh inning, the Sox scored four runs, all with two outs, including Brent Lillibridge's second home run of the season. The Sox took the victory 10–6. They were now 2–1 when they had given up a three-run lead in the ninth. Also on that same day, Chicago acquired Manny Ramírez off waivers from the Los Angeles Dodgers. The White Sox finished with a record of 14–15 in August and 0–5 in walk-off games.

September 
On September 3, the game in Boston was postponed due to Hurricane Earl. On September 4, the White Sox swept the doubleheader at Red Sox with identical scores 3–1 with both saves from Bobby Jenks. It is the first time the White Sox swept the doubleheader in Boston since 1991. Then on September 5, the White Sox swept the Red Sox at Fenway Park for their first time since July 27–28, 1991 when the Sox came back with four runs in the top of the ninth inning to take a 7–5 lead, all with two outs. Also, Manny Ramírez faced his former teammate, which he went 3–8 combined in this series. The White Sox finished the 10-game road trip 7–3, all three losses came in final three road games. With the WLLL format in four-game series at Tigers, since 2006, they're 0–7 in the finale of the four-game set after winning the first game and losing the next two. On September 12, Lucas Harrell allowed six runs in the first inning in courtesy of two three-run homers even before the Sox will bat, then the Sox scored twelve unanswered runs to beat the Royals 12–6 and win this weekend series. It is the biggest White Sox comeback so far this season. Also in this game, Paul Konerko hit two two-run homers and five RBIs, recording his fourth career 30 homer/100 RBI season. From September 14–16, the Sox got swept by Twins at home, losing 9 of their last 11 home games against these Twins. With that sweep, the Sox fell to nine games back and Twins outscored the Sox 26–11. Then the next series against the Tigers at home, the Sox got swept again. The Sox got swept by Tigers at home for the first time since April 2001. During the finale of that series, the Sox tied the game at 7 after scoring four runs in the bottom of the ninth inning. The Sox lost in 11 innings to Tigers 9–7, but in the bottom of the eleventh, Paul Konerko nearly hit a walk-off three-run homer, but it was foul just a couple feet from the foul pole. In that game, the Sox left 21 men on base and went 4–24 with runners in scoring position. On September 22 at Oakland Athletics, the Sox avoided getting swept for third consecutive times by scoring two runs in the top of the ninth inning and went on to a 4–3 victory. That victory also avoided their nine-game losing streak for the first time since 1991 and first time in September since 1976. Then the Sox swept the Angels in Los Angeles for the first time since April 2006. In this series, the Sox outscored the Angels 12–6 and finished the season series against the Angels 7–2 and won seven in a row against them. They finished the season road record 43–38 (4th best in AL, 3rd best since 1999), better than last year's 36–45. In this season, the Sox swept five opponents on the road compared to two last season, four of them are the losing teams. Finally on September 28 against the Boston Red Sox, Dayán Viciedo gave the White Sox their first walk-off hit since April 24, winning it 5–4, which came back from a 3–0 deficit. It is only the third walk-off win this season which trails the majors against seven walk-off losses, all since the All-Star break. The result of this four-game series against the Red Sox is LWWW, first time they had this result since 2006. The White Sox finished September with a record of 14–13.

October 
The White Sox concluded the regular season with a 2–1 record in October.

Game log 

|- align="center" bgcolor="bbffbb"
| 1 || April 5 || Indians || 6–0 || Buehrle (1–0) || Westbrook (0–1) || || 2:24 || 38,935 || 1–0 || 0 || box
|- align="center" bgcolor="ffbbbb"
| 2 || April 7 || Indians || 5–3 || Carmona (1–0) || Williams (0–1) || Perez (1) || 3:10 || 19,514 || 1–1 || −½ || box
|- align="center" bgcolor="ffbbbb"
| 3 || April 8 || Indians || 5–3 (11) || Lewis (1–0) || Putz (0–1) || Perez (2) || 3:59 || 18,637 || 1–2 || −1½ || box
|- align="center" bgcolor="ffbbbb"
| 4 || April 9 || Twins || 4–3 (11) || Duensing (1–0) || Peña (0–1) || Rauch (3) || 3:43 || 21,416 || 1–3 || −2½ || box
|- align="center" bgcolor="ffbbbb"
| 5 || April 10 || Twins || 2–1 || Baker (1–1) || García (0–1) || Rauch (4) || 2:35 || 28,337 || 1–4 || −3½ || box
|- align="center" bgcolor="bbffbb"
| 6 || April 11 || Twins || 5–4 || Buehrle (2–0) || Blackburn (1–1) || Jenks (1) || 2:14 || 25,550 || 2–4 || −3 || box
|- align="center" bgcolor="bbffbb"
| 7 || April 12 || @ Blue Jays || 8–7 (11) || Thornton (1–0) || Accardo (0–1) || Jenks (2) || 3:29 || 46,321 || 3–4 || −2½ || box
|- align="center" bgcolor="ffbbbb"
| 8 || April 13 || @ Blue Jays || 4–2 || Romero (1–0) || Floyd (0–1) || Gregg (3) || 2:11 || 12,167 || 3–5 || −3 || box
|- align="center" bgcolor="bbffbb"
| 9 || April 14 || @ Blue Jays || 11–1 || Danks (1–0) || Morrow (0–1) || || 2:47 || 10,610 || 4–5 || −2 || box
|- align="center" bgcolor="ffbbbb"
| 10 || April 15 || @ Blue Jays || 7–3 || Eveland (2–0) || García (0–2)|| || 2:47 || 10,744 || 4–6 || −3 || box
|- align="center" bgcolor="ffbbbb"
| 11 || April 16 || @ Indians || 6–2 || Talbot (1–1) || Buehrle (2–1) || || 2:04 || 10,421 || 4–7 || −4 || box
|- align="center" bgcolor="ffbbbb"
| 12 || April 17 || @ Indians || 3–2 || Lewis (2–0) || Thornton (1–1) || Perez (3) || 2:44 || 12,885 || 4–8 || −5 || box
|- align="center" bgcolor="ffbbbb"
| 13 || April 18 || @ Indians || 7–4 || Carmona (2–0) || Floyd (0–2) || Perez (4) || 3:07 || 10,564 || 4–9 || −5 || box
|- align="center" bgcolor="bbffbb"
| 14 || April 20 || Rays || 4–1 || Danks (2–0) || Price (2–1) || Jenks (3) || 2:22 || 19,260 || 5–9 || −5 || box
|- align="center" bgcolor="ffbbbb"
| 15 || April 21 || Rays || 12–0 || Davis (1–1) || Buehrle (2–2) || || 3:00 || 17,023 || 5–10 || −6 || box
|- align="center" bgcolor="ffbbbb"
| 16 || April 22 || Rays || 10–2 || Shields (2–0) || Peavy (0–1) || || 2:50 || 18,207 || 5–11 || −6 || box
|- align="center" bgcolor="bbffbb"
| 17 || April 23 || Mariners || 7–6 || Thornton (2–1) || Lowe (1–2) || || 2:57 || 24,653 || 6–11 || −6 || box
|- align="center" bgcolor="bbffbb"
| 18 || April 24 || Mariners || 5–4 || Jenks (1–0) || Aardsma (0–1) || || 2:34 || 25,253 || 7–11 || −6 || box
|- align="center" bgcolor="bbffbb"
| 19 || April 25 || Mariners || 3–2 || Danks (3–0) || League (2–1) || Jenks (4) || 2:14 || 28,274 || 8–11 || −5 || box
|- align="center" bgcolor="ffbbbb"
| 20 || April 27 || @ Rangers || 4–2 || Wilson (2–1) || Buehrle (2–3) || Francisco (1) || 2:19 || 14,589 || 8–12 || −6 || box
|- align="center" bgcolor="ffbbbb"
| 21 || April 28 || @ Rangers || 6–5 || Harden (1–1) || Peavy (0–2) || Feliz (3) || 2:48 || 20,432 || 8–13 || −6 || box
|- align="center" bgcolor="bbffbb"
| 22 || April 29 || @ Rangers || 7–5 || Floyd (1–2) || O'Day (0–1) || || 2:53 || 17,778 || 9–13 || −5 || box
|- align="center" bgcolor="ffbbbb"
| 23 || April 30 || @ Yankees || 6–4 || Aceves (2–0) || Thornton (2–2) || Rivera (7) || 2:58 || 44,783 || 9–14 || −6 || box
|-

|- align="center" bgcolor="bbffbb"
| 24 || May 1 || @ Yankees || 7–6 || Linebrink (1–0) || Robertson (0–2) || Jenks (5) || 3:49 || 45,265 || 10–14 || −5 || box
|- align="center" bgcolor="ffbbbb"
| 25 || May 2 || @ Yankees || 12–3 || Hughes (3–0) || Buehrle (2–4) || || 3:06 || 45,303 || 10–15 || −6 || box
|- align="center" bgcolor="bbffbb"
| 26 || May 3 || Royals || 5–1 || Peavy (1–2) || Meche (0–3) || || 2:25 || 21,208 || 11–15 || −6 || box
|- align="center" bgcolor="ffbbbb"
| 27 || May 4 || Royals || 7–2 || Hochevar (3–1) || Floyd (1–3) || || 2:40 || 17,157 || 11–16 || −7 || box
|- align="center" bgcolor="bbffbb"
| 28 || May 5 || Royals || 9–2 || García (1–2) || Bannister (1–2) || || 2:35 || 21,255 || 12–16 || −7 || box
|- align="center" bgcolor="ffbbbb"
| 29 || May 6 || Blue Jays || 2–0 || Eveland (3–1) || Danks (3–1) || Gregg (8) || 2:30 || 20,106 || 12–17 || −7 || box
|- align="center" bgcolor="ffbbbb"
| 30 || May 7 || Blue Jays || 7–4 (12) || Downs (1–3) || Putz (0–2) || || 3:12 || 20,072 || 12–18 || −7½ || box
|- align="center" bgcolor="bbffbb"
| 31 || May 8 || Blue Jays || 7–3 || Peavy (2–2) || Cecil (2–2) || || 2:42 || 24,945 || 13–18 || −7 || box
|- align="center" bgcolor="ffbbbb"
| 32 || May 9 || Blue Jays || 9–7 || Frasor (2–1) || Jenks (1–1) || Gregg (9) || 3:29 || 23,850 || 13–19 || −8 || box
|- align="center" bgcolor="bbffbb"
| 33 || May 11 || @ Twins || 5–2 || García (2–2) || Slowey (4–3) || Jenks (6) || 2:39 || 38,764 || 14–19 || −7 || box
|- align="center" bgcolor="ffbbbb"
| 34 || May 12 || @ Twins || 3–2 || Pavano (4–3) || Danks (3–2) || Rauch (9) || 2:22 || 38,895 || 14–20 || −8 || box
|- align="center" bgcolor="ffbbbb"
| 35 || May 14 || @ Royals || 6–1 || Hughes (1–1) || Buehrle (2–5) || || 2:25 || 27,816 || 14–21 || −8 || box
|- align="center" bgcolor="bbffbb"
| 36 || May 15 || @ Royals || 5–4 || Peavy (3–2) || Hochevar (3–2) || Thornton (1) || 2:33 || 22,192 || 15–21 || −7 || box
|- align="center" bgcolor="ffbbbb"
| 37 || May 16 || @ Royals || 5–3 || Bannister (2–3) || Floyd (1–4) || Soria (9) || 2:20 || 13,922 || 15–22 || −8 || box
|- align="center" bgcolor="bbbbbb"
| – || May 17 || @ Tigers ||colspan=7| Postponed (rain), rescheduled for August 3 || −8½ || 
|- align="center" bgcolor="bbffbb"
| 38 || May 18 || @ Tigers || 6–2 || García (3–2) || Porcello (3–4) || || 2:44 || 28,155 || 16–22 || −7½ || box
|- align="center" bgcolor="ffbbbb"
| 39 || May 19 || Angels || 3–2 || Saunders (3–5) || Danks (3–3) || Fuentes (5) || 2:26 || 23,271 || 16–23 || −7½ || box
|- align="center" bgcolor="ffbbbb"
| 40 || May 20 || Angels || 6–5 || Santana (3–3) || Peavy (3–3) || Fuentes (6) || 3:00 || 23,515 || 16–24 || −7½ || box
|- align="cen1er" bgcolor="bbffbb"
| 41 || May 21 || Marlins || 8–0 || Buehrle (3–5) || Nolasco (4–3) || || 2:08 || 20,652 || 17–24 || −7½ || box
|- align="center" bgcolor="bbffbb"
| 42 || May 22 || Marlins || 4–1 || Floyd (2–4) || Volstad (3–5) || Jenks (7) || 2:46 || 28,462 || 18–24 || −7½ || box
|- align="center" bgcolor="ffbbbb"
| 43 || May 23 || Marlins || 13–0 || Johnson (5–1) || García (3–3) || || 3:14 || 28,298 || 18–25 || −7½ || box
|- align="center" bgcolor="bbffbb"
| 44 || May 24 || @ Indians || 7–2 || Danks (4–3) || Masterson (0–5) || || 3:00 || 10,166 || 19–25 || −7 || box
|- align="center" bgcolor="ffbbbb"
| 45 || May 25 || @ Indians || 7–3 || Talbot (6–3) || Peavy (3–4) || || 2:16 || 14,441 || 19–26 || −7 || box
|- align="center" bgcolor="bbffbb"
| 46 || May 26 || @ Indians || 5–4 || Peña (1–1) || Westbrook (2–3) || || 2:44 || 18,109 || 20–26 || −6 || box
|- align="center" bgcolor="ffbbbb"
| 47 || May 27 || @ Rays || 5–1 || Niemann (5–0) || Floyd (2–5) || || 2:29 || 13,299 || 20–27 || −7 || box
|- align="center" bgcolor="bbffbb"
| 48 || May 28 || @ Rays || 4–2 || García (4–3) || Price (7–2) || Thornton (2) || 2:35 || 20,650 || 21–27 || −7 || box
|- align="center" bgcolor="ffbbbb"
| 49 || May 29 || @ Rays || 8–5 || Davis (5–4) || Danks (4–4) || Soriano (14) || 3:18 || 33,588 || 21–28 || −8 || box
|- align="center" bgcolor="bbffbb"
| 50 || May 30 || @ Rays || 8–5 || Peavy (4–4) || Shields (5–3) || || 3:14 || 26,878 || 22–28 || −8 || box
|-

|- align="center" bgcolor="ffbbbb"
| 51 || June 1 || Rangers || 9–6 || Harden (3–1) || Buehrle (3–6) || Feliz (14) || 3:19 || 20,075 || 22–29 || −8½ || box
|- align="center" bgcolor="ffbbbb"
| 52 || June 2 || Rangers || 9–5 || Feldman (3–5) || Floyd (2–6) || || 2:51 || 19,516 || 22–30 || −8½ || box
|- align="center" bgcolor="bbffbb"
| 53 || June 3 || Rangers || 4–3 || García (5–3) || Lewis (4–4) || Jenks (8) || 2:27 || 20,003 || 23–30 || −7½ || box
|- align="center" bgcolor="ffbbbb"
| 54 || June 4 || Indians || 10–1 || Masterson (1–5) || Danks (4–4) || || 3:08 || 20,713 || 23–31 || −8½ || box
|- align="center" bgcolor="ffbbbb"
| 55 || June 5 || Indians || 3–1 || Talbot (7–4) || Peavy (4–5) || Wood (4) || 2:49 || 30,864 || 23–32 || −9½ || box
|- align="center" bgcolor="bbffbb"
| 56 || June 6 || Indians || 8–7 || Putz (1–2) || Sipp (0–2) || Jenks (9) || 3:17 || 27,577 || 24–32 || −8½ || box
|- align="center" bgcolor="ffbbbb"
| 57 || June 8 || Tigers || 7–2 || Thomas (3–0) || Thornton (2–3) || || 2:59 || 20,776 || 24–33 || −9½ || box
|- align="center" bgcolor="bbffbb"
| 58 || June 9 || Tigers || 15–3 || García (6–3) || Porcello (4–6) || || 2:32 || 21,959 || 25–33 || −9½ || box
|- align="center" bgcolor="bbffbb"
| 59 || June 10 || Tigers || 3–0 || Danks (5–5) || Scherzer (2–6) || Jenks (10) || 2:15 || 26,004 || 26–33 || −8½ || box
|- align="center" bgcolor="bbffbb"
| 60 || June 11 || @ Cubs || 10–5 || Peavy (5–5) || Wells (3–5) || || 3:08 || 41,129 || 27–33 || −8½ || box
|- align="center" bgcolor="bbffbb"
| 61 || June 12 || @ Cubs || 2–1 || Buehrle (4–6) || Silva (8–1) || Jenks (11) || 2:54 || 40,397 || 28–33 || −7½ || box
|- align="center" bgcolor="ffbbbb"
| 62 || June 13 || @ Cubs || 1–0 || Lilly (2–5) || Floyd (2–7) || Mármol (13) || 2:20 || 40,456 || 28–34 || −7½ || box
|- align="center" bgcolor="bbffbb"
| 63 || June 15 || @ Pirates || 6–4 || García (7–3) || Lincoln (0–1) || Jenks (12) || 3:11 || 12,693 || 29–34 || −7½ || box
|- align="center" bgcolor="bbffbb"
| 64 || June 16 || @ Pirates || 7–2 || Danks (6–5) || Duke (3–8) || || 2:26 || 15,218 || 30–34 || −7½ || box
|- align="center" bgcolor="bbffbb"
| 65 || June 17 || @ Pirates || 5–4 || Buehrle (5–6) || Ohlendorf (0–5) || Jenks (13) || 2:38 || 23,170 || 31–34 || −6½ || box
|- align="center" bgcolor="bbffbb"
| 66 || June 18 || @ Nationals || 2–1 (11) || Putz (2–2) || Storen (2–1) || Jenks (14) || 2:55 || 40,325 || 32–34 || −5½ || box
|- align="center" bgcolor="bbffbb"
| 67 || June 19 || @ Nationals || 1–0 || Peavy (6–5) || Martin (0–3) || || 2:34 || 36,487 || 33–34 || −5½ || box
|- align="center" bgcolor="bbffbb"
| 68 || June 20 || @ Nationals || 6–3 || García (8–3) || Lannan (2–5) || Putz (1) || 2:39 || 31,763 || 34–34 || −5½ || box
|- align="center" bgcolor="bbffbb"
| 69 || June 22 || Braves || 9–6 || Danks (7–5) || Hanson (7–4) || Jenks (15) || 2:38 || 28,773 || 35–34 || −4½ || box
|- align="center" bgcolor="bbffbb"
| 70 || June 23 || Braves || 4–2 || Buehrle (6–6) || Hudson (7–3) || Jenks (16) || 2:20 || 27,561 || 36–34 || −3½ || box
|- align="center" bgcolor="bbffbb"
| 71 || June 24 || Braves || 2–0 || Putz (3–2) || Saito (1–3) || Jenks (17) || 2:17 || 31,076 || 37–34 || −2½ || box
|- align="center" bgcolor="bbffbb"
| 72 || June 25 || Cubs || 6–0 || Peavy (7–5) || Zambrano (3–6) ||  || 2:22 || 39,364 || 38–34 || −1½ || box
|- align="center" bgcolor="bbffbb"
| 73 || June 26 || Cubs || 3–2 || Putz (4–2) || Cashner (0–1) || Thornton (3) || 2:35 || 39,479 || 39–34 || −1½ || box
|- align="center" bgcolor="ffbbbb"
| 74 || June 27 || Cubs || 8–6 || Dempster (6–6) || Danks (7–6) || || 2:57 || 39,682 || 39–35 || −1½ || box
|- align="center" bgcolor="ffbbbb"
| 75 || June 28 || @ Royals || 3–1 || Lerew (1–1) || Buehrle (6–7) || Soria (19) || 2:27 || 15,056 || 39–36 || −2 || box
|- align="center" bgcolor="bbffbb"
| 76 || June 29 || @ Royals || 4–3 || Floyd (3–7) || Bannister (7–6) || Putz (2) || 2:55 || 19,364 || 40–36 || −1½ || box
|- align="center" bgcolor="ffbbbb"
| 77 || June 30 || @ Royals || 7–6 || Greinke (4–8) || Peavy (7–6) || Soria (20) || 2:30 || 18,335 || 40–37 || −2½ || box
|-

|- align="center" bgcolor="bbffbb"
| 78 || July 2 || @ Rangers || 5–3 || Putz (5–2) || Feliz (1–2) || Thornton (4) || 2:54 || 30,193 || 41–37 || −2 || box
|- align="center" bgcolor="ffbbbb"
| 79 || July 3 || @ Rangers || 3–1 || Hunter (5–0) || Danks (7–7) || Feliz (22) || 2:33 || 25,986 || 41–38 || −2 || box
|- align="center" bgcolor="bbffbb"
| 80 || July 4 || @ Rangers || 5–3 || Buehrle (7–7) || Feldman (5–8) || Thornton (5) || 2:27 || 45,020 || 42–38 || −1 || box
|- align="center" bgcolor="bbffbb"
| 81 || July 5 || Angels || 9–2 || Floyd (4–7) || Kazmir (7–8) || Santos (1) || 2:49 || 38,092 || 43–38 || −1 || box
|- align="center" bgcolor="bbffbb"
| 82 || July 6 || Angels || 4–1 || Peña (2–1) || Weaver (8–4) || Jenks (18) || 2:54 || 21,889 || 44–38 || −1 || box
|- align="center" bgcolor="bbffbb"
| 83 || July 7 || Angels || 5–2 || García (9–3) || Saunders (6–9) || Jenks (19) || 2:48 || 21,135 || 45–38 || −1 || box
|- align="center" bgcolor="bbffbb"
| 84 || July 8 || Angels || 1–0 || Danks (8–7) || Santana (8–7) || || 1:50 || 27,734 || 46–38 || −½ || box
|- align="center" bgcolor="bbffbb"
| 85 || July 9 || Royals || 8–2 || Buehrle (8–7) || Chen (5–3) || || 2:38 ||25,572 || 47–38 || −½ || box
|- align="center" bgcolor="bbffbb"
| 86 || July 10 || Royals || 5–1 || Floyd (5–7) || Bannister (7–7) || || 2:22 || 32,339 || 48–38 || −½ || box
|- align="center" bgcolor="bbffbb"
| 87 || July 11 || Royals || 15–5 || Peña (3–1) || Lerew (1–3) || || 2:43 || 29,040 || 49–38 || +½ || box
|- align="center" bgcolor="bbcaff"
| colspan="12" bgcolor="#bbcaff" | All–Star Break: NL defeats AL 3–1 at Angel Stadium of Anaheim
|- align="center" bgcolor="bbffbb"
| 88 || July 15 || @ Twins || 8–7 || Danks (9–7) || Burnett (1–2) || Jenks (20) || 3:34 || 40,697 || 50–38 || +1 || box
|- align="center" bgcolor="ffbbbb"
| 89 || July 16 || @ Twins || 7–4 || Liriano (7–7) || Floyd (5–8) || Crain (1) || 3:09 || 40,427 || 50–39 || +1 ||box
|- align="center" bgcolor="ffbbbb"
| 90 || July 17 || @ Twins || 3–2 || Pavano (11–6) || Buehrle (8–8) || || 1:52 || 40,637 || 50–40 || +1½ || box
|- align="center" bgcolor="ffbbbb" 
| 91 || July 18 || @ Twins || 7–6 || Duensing (3–1) || Jenks (1–2) || || 3:07 || 40,336 || 50–41 || +1½ || box
|- align="center" bgcolor="bbffbb"
| 92 || July 19 || @ Mariners || 6–1 || Hudson (1–0) || Pauley (0–2) || || 2:45 || 21,749 || 51–41 || +2½ || box
|- align="center" bgcolor="bbffbb"
| 93 || July 20 || @ Mariners || 4–0 || Danks (10–7) || Fister (3–6) || || 2:11 || 21,366 || 52–41 || +3½ || box
|- align="center" bgcolor="ffbbbb" 
| 94 || July 21 || @ Mariners || 2–1 (11) || League (7–6) || Jenks (1–3) || || 2:49 || 21,529 || 52–42 || +2½ || box
|- align="center" bgcolor="bbffbb"
| 95 || July 23 || @ Athletics || 5–1 || Buehrle (9–8) || Cahill (9–4) || || 2:16 || 15,103 || 53–42 || +2½ || box
|- align="center" bgcolor="ffbbbb"
| 96 || July 24 || @ Athletics || 10–2 || Mazzaro (6–2) || García (9–4) || || 3:04 || 17,439 || 53–43 || +2 || box
|- align="center" bgcolor="ffbbbb"
| 97 || July 25 || @ Athletics || 6–4 || Braden (5–7) || Hudson (1–1) || Wuertz (3) || 2:46 || 17,148 || 53–44 || +1 || box
|- align="center" bgcolor="bbffbb"
| 98 || July 26 || Mariners || 6–1 || Danks (11–7) || Hernández (7–7) || || 2:24 || 38,815 || 54–44 || +1 || box
|- align="center" bgcolor="bbffbb"
| 99 || July 27 || Mariners || 11–0 || Floyd (6–8) || Rowland-Smith (1–10) || || 2:04 || 26,080 || 55–44 || +1 || box
|- align="center" bgcolor="bbffbb"
| 100 || July 28 || Mariners || 6–5 || Thornton (3–3) || Wright (1–3) || Jenks (21) || 2:57 || 25,126 || 56–44 || +1 || box
|- align="center" bgcolor="bbffbb"
| 101 || July 29 || Mariners || 9–5 || García (10–4) || Pauley (0–3) || || 2:43 || 28,483 || 57–44 || +1½ || box
|- align="center" bgcolor="bbffbb"
| 102 || July 30 || Athletics || 6–1 || Harrell (1–0) || Anderson (2–2) || || 2:34 || 29,431 || 58–44 || +1½ || box
|- align="center" bgcolor="ffbbbb"
| 103 || July 31 || Athletics || 6–2 || Braden (6–7) || Danks (11–8) || || 2:27 || 35,852 || 58–45 || +½ || box
|-

|- align="center" bgcolor="bbffbb"
| 104 || August 1 || Athletics || 4–1 || Floyd (7–8) || Gonzalez (9–7) || Jenks (22) || 2:19 || 32,118 || 59–45 || +½ || box
|- align="center" bgcolor="bbffbb"
| 105 || August 3 || @ Tigers || 12–2 || Buehrle (10–8) || Porcello (4–10) || || 2:25 || 26,141 || 60–45 || +1½ || box
|- align="center" bgcolor="ffbbbb"
| 106 || August 3 || @ Tigers || 7–1 || Bonderman (6–6) || Torres (0–1) || || 2:27 || 24,826 || 60–46 || +1½ || box
|- align="center" bgcolor="bbffbb"
| 107 || August 4 || @ Tigers || 4–1 || Jackson (1–0) || Galarraga (3–4) || Jenks (23) || 2:51 || 31,770 || 61–46 || +1½ || box
|- align="center" bgcolor="bbffbb"
| 108 || August 5 || @ Tigers || 6–4 (11) || Santos (1–0) || Valverde (1–3) || || 3:18 || 34,156 || 62–46 || +1½ || box
|- align="center" bgcolor="ffbbbb"
| 109 || August 6 || @ Orioles || 2–1 (10) || Simón (3–2) || Peña (3–2) || || 2:57 || 19,687 || 62–47 || +1½ || box
|- align="center" bgcolor="bbffbb"
| 110 || August 7 || @ Orioles || 4–2 || Floyd (8–8) || Berken (3–3) || Putz (3) || 2:49 || 24,939 || 63–47 || +1½ || box
|- align="center" bgcolor="ffbbbb"
| 111 || August 8 || @ Orioles || 4–3 || Guthrie (6–11) || Buehrle (10–9) || Simón (17) || 2:19 || 18,283 || 63–48 || +½ || box
|- align="center" bgcolor="ffbbbb"
| 112 || August 9 || @ Orioles || 3–2 (10) || Albers (4–3) || Putz (5–3) || || 2:58 || 14,135 || 63–49 || 0 || box
|- align="center" bgcolor="ffbbbb"
| 113 || August 10 || Twins || 12–6 || Baker (10–9) || García (10–5) || || 2:52 || 30,900 || 63–50 || −1 || box
|- align="center" bgcolor="bbffbb"
| 114 || August 11 || Twins || 6–1 || Danks (12–8) || Perkins (0–1) || || 2:35 || 32,033 || 64–50 || 0 || box
|- align="center" bgcolor="ffbbbb"
| 115 || August 12 || Twins || 6–1 || Liriano (11–7) || Floyd (8–9) || || 3:09 || 33,237 || 64–51 || −1 || box 
|- align="center" bgcolor="bbffbb"
| 116 || August 13 || Tigers || 8–4 || Buehrle (11–9) || Bonderman (6–8) || || 2:20 || 34,834 || 65–51 || −1 || box
|- align="center" bgcolor="ffbbbb"
| 117 || August 14 || Tigers || 3–2 || Coke (7–2) || Putz (5–4) || || 2:53 || 36,548 || 65–52 || −2 || box
|- align="center" bgcolor="ffbbbb"
| 118 || August 15 || Tigers || 13–8 || Thomas (5–1) || Putz (5–5) || || 3:31 || 36,287 || 65–53 || −3 || box
|- align="center" bgcolor="ffbbbb"
| 119 || August 17 || @ Twins || 7–6 (10) || Mahay (1–1) || Thornton (3–4) || || 3:11 || 40,714 || 65–54 || −4 || box
|- align="center" bgcolor="ffbbbb"
| 120 || August 18 || @ Twins || 7–6 || Manship (1–0) || Floyd (8–10) || Capps (31) || 3:11 || 40,702 || 65–55 || −5 || box
|- align="center" bgcolor="bbffbb"
| 121 || August 19 || @ Twins || 11–0 || Buehrle (12–9) || Pavano (15–8) || || 2:31 || 40,723 || 66–55 || −4 || box
|- align="center" bgcolor="bbbbbb"
| – || August 20 || @ Royals ||colspan=7| Postponed (rain), rescheduled for August 21 || −4½ || 
|- align="center" bgcolor="ffbbbb"
| 122 || August 21 || @ Royals || 6–5 (11) || Chavez (5–3) || Sale (0–1) || || 3:25 || N/A || 66–56 || −4½ || box
|- align="center" bgcolor="bbffbb"
| 123 || August 21 || @ Royals || 7–6 (10) || Putz (6–5) || Holland (0–1) || || 3:06 || 25,543 || 67–56 || −4 || box
|- align="center" bgcolor="ffbbbb"
| 124 || August 22 || @ Royals || 3–2 (10) || O'Sullivan (2–4) || Linebrink (1–1) || || 3:01 || 18,877 || 67–57 || −5 || box
|- align="center" bgcolor="bbffbb"
| 125 || August 24 || Orioles || 7–5 || Floyd (9–10) || Guthrie (7–13) || Jenks (24) || 2:58 || 26,263 || 68–57 || −3½ || box
|- align="center" bgcolor="ffbbbb"
| 126 || August 25 || Orioles || 4–2 || Matusz (6–12) || Buehrle (12–10) || Uehara (2) || 2:22 || 23,733 || 68–58 || −3½ || box
|- align="center" bgcolor="bbffbb"
| 127 || August 26 || Orioles || 8–0 || Jackson (2–0) || Arrieta (4–6) || || 2:42 || 23,898 || 69–58 || −3½ || box
|- align="center" bgcolor="bbffbb"
| 128 || August 27 || Yankees || 9–4 || García (11–5) || Burnett (9–12) || || 2:51 || 38,596 || 70–58 || −3½ || box
|- align="center" bgcolor="ffbbbb"
| 129 || August 28 || Yankees || 12–9 || Sabathia (18–5) || Danks (12–9) || Rivera (26) || 3:31 || 38,811 || 70–59 || −4½ || box
|- align="center" bgcolor="ffbbbb"
| 130 || August 29 || Yankees || 2–1 || Nova (1–0) || Floyd (9–11) || Rivera (27) || 3:25 || 39,433 || 70–60 || −4½ || box
|- align="center" bgcolor="bbffbb"
| 131 || August 30 || @ Indians || 10–6 (11) || Linebrink (2–1) || Perez (4–1) || || 4:11 || 10,663 || 71–60 || −4 || box
|- align="center" bgcolor="bbffbb"
| 132 || August 31 || @ Indians || 4–3 || Jackson (3–0) || Smith (1–2) || Jenks (25) || 2:44 || 12,006 || 72–60 || –4 || box
|-

|- align="center" bgcolor="bbffbb"
| 133 || September 1 || @ Indians || 6–4 || Peña (4–2) || Germano (0–1) || Sale (1) || 2:49 || 12,563 || 73–60 || −4 || box
|- align="center" bgcolor="bbbbbb"
| − || September 3 || @ Red Sox ||colspan=7| Postponed (rain from Hurricane Earl), rescheduled for September 4 || −4 ||
|- align="center" bgcolor="bbffbb"
| 134 || September 4 || @ Red Sox || 3–1 || Danks (13–9) || Buchholz (15–6) || Jenks (26) || 2:53 || 37,411 || 74–60 || −4 || box
|- align="center" bgcolor="bbffbb"
| 135 || September 4 || @ Red Sox || 3–1 || Floyd (10–11) || Lackey (12–9) || Jenks (27) || 3:03 || 37,858 || 75–60 || −3½ || box
|- align="center" bgcolor="bbffbb"
| 136 || September 5 || @ Red Sox || 7–5 || Linebrink (3–1) || Papelbon (5–6) || Thornton (6) || 4:05 || 37,570 || 76–60 || −3½ || box
|- align="center" bgcolor="bbffbb"
| 137 || September 6 || @ Tigers || 5–4 (10) || Sale (1–1) || Valverde (2–4) || || 3:00 || 32,924 || 77–60 || −3½ || box
|- align="center" bgcolor="ffbbbb"
| 138 || September 7 || @ Tigers || 9–1 || Verlander (15–8) || García (11–6) || || 2:52 || 24,905 || 77–61 || −4½ || box
|- align="center" bgcolor="ffbbbb"
| 139 || September 8 || @ Tigers || 5–1 || Bonderman (8–9) || Danks (13–10) || || 2:04 || 25,995 || 77–62 || −5½ || box
|- align="center" bgcolor="ffbbbb"
| 140 || September 9 || @ Tigers || 6–3 || Porcello (9–11) || Floyd (10–12) || Perry (2) || 2:12 || 29,995 || 77–63 || −6 || box
|- align="center" bgcolor="bbffbb"
| 141 || September 10 || Royals || 4–3 || Putz (7–5) || Tejeda (3–4) || Sale (2) || 2:24 || 27,009 || 78–63 || −5 || box
|- align="center" bgcolor="ffbbbb"
| 142 || September 11 || Royals || 8–2 || Davies (8–9) || Jackson (3–1) || || 3:07 || 26,389 || 78–64 || −6 || box
|- align="center" bgcolor="bbffbb"
| 143 || September 12 || Royals || 12–6 || Santos (2–0) || Humber (1–1) || || 3:26 || 23,756 || 79–64 || −6 || box
|- align="center" bgcolor="ffbbbb"
| 144 || September 14 || Twins || 9–3 || Liriano (14–7) || Danks (13–11) || || 3:00 || 29,223 || 79–65 || −7 || box
|- align="center" bgcolor="ffbbbb"
| 145 || September 15 || Twins || 9–3 || Duensing (9–2) || Floyd (10–13) || || 3:04 || 30,063 || 79–66 || −8 || box
|- align="center" bgcolor="ffbbbb"
| 146 || September 16 || Twins || 8–5 || Pavano (17–11) || Buehrle (12–11) || Capps (13) || 3:25 || 27,180 || 79–67 || −9 || box
|- align="center" bgcolor="ffbbbb"
| 147 || September 17 || Tigers || 9–2 || Scherzer (11–10) || Jackson (3–2) || || 2:39 || 28,563 || 79–68 || −9 || box
|- align="center" bgcolor="ffbbbb"
| 148 || September 18 || Tigers || 6–3 || Verlander (17–8) || Santos (2–1) || || 2:42 || 27,828 || 79–69 || −10 || box
|- align="center" bgcolor="ffbbbb"
| 149 || September 19 || Tigers || 9–7 (11) || Weinhardt (2–2) || Santos (2–2) || Schlereth (1) || 4:13 || 25,417 || 79–70 || −10 || box
|- align="center" bgcolor="ffbbbb"
| 150 || September 20 || @ Athletics || 3–0 || Bonser (1–0) || Linebrink (3–2)  || Breslow (3) || 2:53 || 10,090 || 79–71 || −11 || box
|- align="center" bgcolor="ffbbbb"
| 151 || September 21 || @ Athletics || 7–2 || Cahill (17–7) || Buehrle (12–12) || || 2:30 || 11,158 || 79–72 || −12 || box
|- align="center" bgcolor="bbffbb"
| 152 || September 22 || @ Athletics || 4–3 || Thornton (4–4) || Ziegler (3–5) || Sale (3) || 2:38 || 16,056 || 80–72 || −12 || box
|- align="center" bgcolor="bbffbb"
| 153 || September 24 || @ Angels || 2–1 || Thornton (5–4) || Rodney (4–3) || || 2:31 || 41,046 || 81–72 || −11 || box
|- align="center" bgcolor="bbffbb"
| 154 || September 25 || @ Angels || 6–2 || Danks (14–11) || Kazmir (9–15) || || 2:37 || 40,758 || 82–72 || −10 || box
|- align="center" bgcolor="bbffbb"
| 155 || September 26 || @ Angels || 4–3 || Peña (5–2) || Weaver (13–12) || Thornton (7) || 2:46 || 42,686 || 83–72 || −9 || box
|- align="center" bgcolor="ffbbbb"
| 156 || September 27 || Red Sox || 6–1 || Buchholz (17–7) || Buehrle (12–13) || || 2:42 || 19,750 || 83–73 || −9 || box
|- align="center" bgcolor="bbffbb"
| 157 || September 28 || Red Sox || 5–4 || Sale (2–1) || Bowden (0–1) || || 3:10 || 16,982 || 84–73 || −8 || box
|- align="center" bgcolor="bbffbb"
| 158 || September 29 || Red Sox || 5–2 || García (12–6) || Beckett (6–6) || Thornton (8) || 2:32 || 32,084 || 85–73 || −8 || box
|- align="center" bgcolor="bbffbb"
| 159 || September 30 || Red Sox || 8–2 || Danks (15–11) || Lester (19–9) || || 2:57 || 30,854 || 86–73 || −7 || box
|- align="center" bgcolor="ffbbbb"
| 160 || October 1 || Indians || 7–3 || Carmona (13–14) ||  Peña (5–3) || || 2:52 || 23,128 || 86–74 || −7 || box
|- align="center" bgcolor="bbffbb"
| 161 || October 2 || Indians || 6–2 (6) || Buehrle (13–13) || Carrasco (2–2) || || 1:46 || 23,702 || 87–74 || −7 || box
|- align="center" bgcolor="bbffbb"
| 162 || October 3 || Indians || 6–5 || Jackson (4–2) || Germano (0–3) || Sale (4) || 2:40 || 24,539 || 88–74 || −6 || box
|-

Player stats

Batting 
Note: G = Games played; AB = At bats; R = Runs scored; H = Hits; 2B = Doubles; 3B = Triples; HR = Home runs; RBI = Runs batted in; BB = Base on balls; SO = Strikeouts; AVG = Batting average; SB = Stolen bases

Pitching 
Note: W = Wins; L = Losses; ERA = Earned run average; G = Games pitched; GS = Games started; SV = Saves; IP = Innings pitched; H = Hits allowed; R = Runs allowed; ER = Earned runs allowed; HR = Home runs allowed; BB = Walks allowed; K = Strikeouts; BAA = Batting average against

Roster

Farm system

References

External links 

 2010 Chicago White Sox season at Baseball Reference
 2010 Chicago White Sox season Official Site
 Chicago White Sox stats

Chicago White Sox seasons
Chicago White Sox
2010 in sports in Illinois